is the 22nd single by Berryz Kobo. The single was released on March 3, 2010, with the A-side Single V following on March 10. It was released in four editions: a regular edition, containing only the CD, and three limited editions, A, B and C. Limited editions A and B contained a bonus DVD, while edition C contained a special "Inazuma Eleven" trading card. All three limited editions included a serial number card, used in a promotional draw.

The single was Berryz' third double A-side single.

"Otakebi Boy Wao!" was used as the 4th ending theme for the Inazuma Eleven anime. and as an ending theme for the Nintendo DS game Inazuma Eleven 3.

The single sold 25000 copies in its first week and debuted in the Oricon Weekly Singles Chart at number 3, making it their highest-ranking single to date. It also stayed in the top 10 for a second week, ranking 9th.

Details 
Otakebi Boy Wao!
Main vocals: Risako Sugaya, Momoko Tsugunaga, Miyabi Natsuyaki

Tomodachi wa Tomodachi Nanda
Main vocals: Risako Sugaya
Minor vocals: Momoko Tsugunaga, Miyabi Natsuyaki

Track listings 
CD 
 
 
 "Otakebi Boy Wao! (Instrumental)"
 "Tomodachi wa Tomodachi Nanda! (Instrumental)"

 Limited edition A DVD
 

 Limited edition B DVD

Charts

References

External links 
 Review: Otakebi Boy Wao!/Tomodachi wa Tomodachi Nanda! / Berryz Kobo - Hotexpress
 Otakebi Boy Wao!/Tomodachi wa Tomodachi Nanda! discography entry on the Hello! Project official website
 Otakebi Boy Wao! Single V entry on the Hello! Project site

Berryz Kobo songs
2010 singles
Song recordings produced by Tsunku
Songs written by Tsunku